Homalanthus novoguineensis is a shrub or small tree in the spurge family (Euphorbiaceae). Mostly found in Australia and nearby tropical islands in disturbed areas near rainforest.

References

Hippomaneae
Flora of Papua New Guinea
Flora of Queensland
Flora of Western Australia
Flora of the Northern Territory